Edward Walter Schorr (February 16, 1892 – September 12, 1969) was an American Major League Baseball pitcher who played for the Chicago Cubs in .

External links

1892 births
1969 deaths
Chicago Cubs players
Baseball players from Ohio
South Bend Benders players
Los Angeles Angels (minor league) players